Melbourne Derby may refer to:

 Melbourne Derby (A-League Men), association football (soccer) matches between A-League teams Melbourne City and Melbourne Victory
 Melbourne Derby (BBL), cricket derby matches between Big Bash League teams Melbourne Renegades and Melbourne Stars
 Melbourne Derby (AIHL), ice hockey matches between the Melbourne Ice and Melbourne Mustangs in the Australian Ice Hockey League
 Melbourne Derby (WNBL), basketball matches between the Dandenong Rangers and Melbourne Boomers in the Women's National Basketball League